Prema Pusthakam is a 1993 Indian Telugu-language romance film which was partly directed by Gollapudi Srinivas before his death on the set of the film; it was later finished by his father, Gollapudi Maruthi Rao. It stars newcomers Ajith Kumar and Kanchan, with Devendran was the music composer. This film is Ajith Kumar's first and only Telugu film to date (in the beginning of his career) and was temporarily put on hold after the director died. The film won three Nandi Awards.

Plot 
Sreekar (Ajith Kumar) and Charitra (Kanchan) are college students. They are expelled from their college. They find themselves homeless and unemployed. They decide to get married. On the eve of the marriage, a rich old man tries to disrobe Charitra with the intention of raping her. Charitra prevents him from disrobing and raping her. She stabs him to death with a thick piece of glass. The next day, she gets married to Sreekar. Seconds after the wedding, police personnel enters the marriage hall and arrest Charitra on the charges of murdering the old man. Even after this incident, Sreekar neither hates her nor does he abandon her. The courts finds Charitra guilty of murder and sentences her.

Cast

Production 
The film was written by Gollapudi Srinivas, son of noted director Gollapudi Maruthi Rao, in early 1992 and Ajith Kumar was signed on to feature in the lead role.  However, during the ninth day of the shoot, the debutant director died after succumbing to injuries suffered during a water accident on sets in Vizag, Andhra Pradesh. The death led to creation of the Gollapudi Srinivas Award, with the director's father Gollapudi Maruthi Rao giving the award to promising debutant directors to continue his son's legacy. The film was duly delayed and later completed by Srinivas's father and only released in 1993.

Soundtrack 
The songs were composed by Devendran.
 "Anukunnadhi"
 "Geluchuko"
 "Kaliki Seethammaku"
 "Manugade Madhuramu"
 "Modhalainadhi Mana" - S. P. Balasubrahmanyam, K. S. Chithra
 "Moodu  Nelalaega"
 "Poornamadham" - K. S. Chithra, S. P. Balasubrahmanyam
 "Thiyagga Puttadhae"
 "Visakha Beach Lo" - S. P. Balasubrahmanyam, K. S. Chithra

Release 
The film has been described by commentators as an "eminently forgettable" debut for Ajith Kumar, due to the problems faced during production.

It was later dubbed and released in Tamil as Kadhal Puthagam in 1997. A reviewer of the dubbed version wrote "The screenplay could have been better as the story flow seems to be discontinuous at times. In spite of this, the director has shown some flashes of talent in some scenes, especially scenes involving Ajit and Kanchan".

Awards
Nandi Awards
 Best Screenplay Writer - Gollapudi Maruthi Rao
 Best Costume Designer - Manohar Reddy
 Special Jury Award - Kanchan

References

External links 
 
Full movie on Youtube

1993 films
1990s Telugu-language films
Films shot in Visakhapatnam
Indian romance films
1990s romance films
Films scored by Devendran